Carlos Miguel Mondim Saleiro (born 25 February 1986) is a Portuguese former professional footballer who played as a forward.

The first baby in Portugal to be born through in vitro fertilisation treatment (IVF), he began his career at Sporting CP. He played for Sporting B in the 2003–04 season, and won caps at every level of Portuguese international football from under-17 to under-23. He helped his country to win the UEFA European Under-17 Championship in 2003 and the International Challenge Trophy in 2009–11. He was loaned out to Olivais e Moscavide from 2005 to 2007, and helped the club to win promotion out of the Segunda Divisão in 2005–06. He spent the 2007–08 season on loan at Fátima, and was loaned out to Primeira Liga clubs Vitória Setúbal and Académica in the 2008–09 campaign.

He made his first team debut for Sporting CP in August 2009, and went on to make 67 first team appearances in two seasons before he moved to Swiss Super League side Servette in July 2011. He signed with Académica in June 2012, and then after a year out of the game joined Oriental in July 2014. He signed with English club Port Vale in July 2016, but left after just six weeks.

Club career

Sporting CP
Carlos Miguel Mondim Saleiro was born in Lisbon on 25 February 1986, and was the first baby in Portugal to be born through in vitro fertilisation treatment (IVF). He spent his youth at Sporting CP's youth academy, and spent the 2003–04 season with Sporting B, scoring three goals in 35 Segunda Divisão – Zona Sul (third tier) matches as they were relegated into the Terceira Divisão (fourth tier).

He spent the latter half of the 2005–06 campaign on loan at Olivais e Moscavide in Segunda Divisão Série D, and though injuries limited him to just two league appearances, he managed to feature in the play-offs as the club secured promotion into the Liga de Honra (second tier). He returned to the club for the 2006–07 campaign, and scored four goals in 26 games as they were relegated in 15th place. He returned to the Liga de Honra for the 2007–08 campaign on loan at newly promoted Fátima, who were coached by Rui Vitória. He scored 11 goals in 32 league and cup appearances despite Fátima sufferering relegation in last place. Despite their league form, Fátima did manage to pull off one of the biggest shock victories of their history by eliminating Porto out of the Taça da Liga on penalties. He was later voted as the second best player of the tournament, behind Cláudio Pitbull, having scored against Santa Clara, converted in the shoot-out against Porto, and scored in the club's fourth round defeat to his parent club Sporting CP. He signed a new four-year contract with Sporting CP in April 2008. He stated that he aimed to win a first team place and was "tired of loans".

He was given Primeira Liga (first tier) experience for the 2008–09 season after securing a loan move to Vitória de Setúbal. However, he featured just five times in the league under coach Daúto Faquirá, leading Saleiro to complain to the press about his lack of first team opportunities. He spent the second half of the campaign on loan at Académica, and finished the season as the club's joint-second highest scorer (tied with Modou Sougou) with four goals in 13 games to help the club secure a seventh-place finish in the Primeira Liga.

Saleiro made his first team debut for the "Lions" under Paulo Bento on 26 August 2009, playing 30 minutes in a 1–1 draw with Fiorentina at the Stadio Artemio Franchi for the last qualifying round of the UEFA Champions League. Four days later he made his league debut for the club, in a 1–0 win at former side Académica. He made a total of 28 appearances in the 2009–10 season, scoring five goals, mostly under the stewardship of new head coach Carlos Carvalhal. He made 39 appearances in the 2010–11 season, scoring two goals, as Sporting CP finished in third place, some distance behind 'Big Three' rivals Porto and Benfica. However, much to his frustration, he was frequently used a late substitute by coach Paulo Sérgio and so had limited game time at the Estádio José Alvalade. He chose to leave Sporting CP a year before the end of his contract to search for first team football elsewhere, despite reports that new head coach Domingos Paciência's rated him highly.

Servette to Oriental
Saleiro signed a two-year contract with Servette in July 2011, who were managed by Portuguese head coach João Alves and director of football Costinha. He hoped the move would allow him a chance to win himself a place in the Portugal squad for UEFA Euro 2012. However, he struggled with injuries and played only seven Swiss Super League matches in the 2011–12 season. He signed with Pedro Emanuel's Académica in June 2012. He missed pre-season with an Achilles tendon injury however, and after returning to fitness in November featured in just seven Primeira Liga and five cup games. He was without a club for the 2013–14 season. He signed with Segunda Liga club Clube Oriental de Lisboa in July 2014. He finished the 2014–15 season with five goals in 20 appearances and signed a one-year contract extension in June 2015. The 2015–16 season proved to be disastrous however, as Oriental were relegated and serious but unproven allegations were made of match fixing against some of the players – though Saleiro himself was not implicated.

Port Vale
Saleiro signed a two-year contract with English League One club Port Vale, managed by Portuguese coach Bruno Ribeiro, in July 2016. He made his debut for the "Valiants" on 9 August, coming on as a 73rd-minute substitute for Chris Mbamba in a 2–1 defeat to Carlisle United in the EFL Cup. However his contract was terminated by mutual consent on 16 August 2016, with a club statement revealing that he "found it difficult to adjust to life in the country".

International career
Saleiro represented Portugal at the 2003 UEFA European Under-17 Championship. He scored against England in the semi-finals, a 2–2 draw at the Estádio do Fontelo; he went on convert his penalty in the shoot-out to help Portugal progress into the final. He also played in the final, where two goals from Márcio Sousa gave Portugal a 2–1 win over Spain to win his country a fifth UEFA European Under-17 Championship title. He also travelled to Finland for the 2003 FIFA U-17 World Championship, where Spain exacted their revenge by eliminating Portugal at the quarter-final stage. In total he scored seven goals in 18 under-17 games, and then won two caps at under-18 level in 2004. The following year he scored one goal in eight appearances for the under-19 team. He travelled with the Portugal under-20 squad for the 2007 Toulon Tournament, and featured in three games.

He was called up to the Portugal under-21 team and appeared in qualification games for the 2009 UEFA European Under-21 Championship, scoring in a 2–0 win over Bulgaria at the Estádio D. Afonso Henriques on 26 March 2008. He was called up to the Portugal under-23 squad for the 2009–11 International Challenge Trophy, and played in the final where Portugal defeated England 1–0 at Sixfields Stadium.

Club statistics

Honours
Olivais e Moscavide
Segunda Divisão: 2005–06

Portugal U17
UEFA European Under-17 Championship: 2003

Portugal U23
International Challenge Trophy: 2009–11

References

1986 births
Living people
In vitro fertilisation
Footballers from Lisbon
Portuguese footballers
Portugal youth international footballers
Portugal under-21 international footballers
Association football forwards
Sporting CP B players
Sporting CP footballers
C.D. Olivais e Moscavide players
C.D. Fátima players
Vitória F.C. players
Associação Académica de Coimbra – O.A.F. players
Clube Oriental de Lisboa players
Portuguese expatriate footballers
Expatriate footballers in Switzerland
Portuguese expatriate sportspeople in Switzerland
Servette FC players
Expatriate footballers in England
Portuguese expatriate sportspeople in England
Port Vale F.C. players
Segunda Divisão players
Liga Portugal 2 players
Primeira Liga players
Swiss Super League players